The Lebanon national under-20 football team is the national under-20 football team of Lebanon and is controlled by the Lebanese Football Association. The team also serves as the national under-19 and national under-18 football teams of Lebanon.

While the team has never qualified for the FIFA U-20 World Cup, they have participated twice in the AFC U-20 Asian Cup, in 1973 and in 2008, with their best result being reaching the quarter-finals in the 1973 edition. In the 2021 WAFF U-18 Championship, the U18 team made history by becoming the first Lebanon men's national team to reach a final, losing to hosts Iraq on penalty-shootouts. They also participate in the Arab Cup U-20 and Jeux de la Francophonie, failing to go past the group stage in both competitions.

Notable former under-20 players include Nour Mansour, Rabih Ataya, and Mohamad Haidar, who all went on to play for the senior side.

Competitive record

FIFA U-20 World Cup

AFC U-20 Asian Cup

Arab Cup U-20

WAFF U-18 Championship

Mediterranean Games

Jeux de la Francophonie

Recent results and matches

2022

Players

Current squad
The following players were called up for the 2023 AFC U-20 Asian Cup qualification games against Cambodia, Tajikistan and Singapore, on 14, 16 and 18 September 2022, respectively.

Recent call-ups
The following footballers were part of a national selection in the past 12 months, but are not part of the current squad.

See also
 Lebanon national football team
 Lebanon national under-23 football team
 Lebanon national under-17 football team
 Lebanon women's national under-20 football team
 Football in Lebanon

References

U20
Asian national under-20 association football teams
Youth football in Lebanon